Sciolze is a comune (municipality) in the Metropolitan City of Turin in the Italian region Piedmont, located about  east of Turin.

Sciolze borders the following municipalities: Gassino Torinese, Rivalba, Cinzano, Marentino, Moncucco Torinese, and Montaldo Torinese.

References

Cities and towns in Piedmont